Peter Lindsay Walsh (born 9 January 1954) is an Australian politician. He has been a National Party member of the Victorian Legislative Assembly since 2002, representing the electorate of Swan Hill until 2014 and Murray Plains thereafter. Walsh was Minister for Agriculture and Food Security and Minister for Water in the Baillieu and Napthine Coalition governments. He has been state leader of the Nationals since 3 December 2014.

Walsh was born and raised at Boort in Northern Victoria, attending Fernihurst Primary School and Boort Secondary College. He was the president of the Victorian Farmers Federation from 1998 until his election to parliament in 2002. Before entering politics, he operated an irrigated horticulture and cropping enterprise, producing tomatoes, cereals, oilseeds and legumes. He was also a director of SPC Limited, a member of the state Food Industry Advisory Council, and a board member of the National Farmers Federation.

Walsh was awarded a Centenary Medal in 2003 for services to the environment. He is a keen Australian rules football fan, having served as a Boort player, committee man and selector. He was President of the Boort Football Club between 1988 and 1990. Walsh was also a member of the local Apex Club from 1982 to 1992, again including a term as President.

Walsh was elected to the Legislative Assembly at the 2002 election, easily retaining the seat for the National Party after the retirement of long-serving MP Barry Steggall. He was re-elected at the 2006 and 2010 elections, receiving 79.3% of the two-party preferred vote in 2010.

Party leadership

In the wake of the Coalition losing government after one term at the 2014 election, outgoing Deputy Premier Peter Ryan retired from the party leadership, declaring that it was time for change. Walsh emerged as the sole unopposed candidate for the leadership to succeed Ryan, with first-term MP Steph Ryan elected deputy leader. Under Walsh and Ryan the National Party has taken a more centrist stance.>

Walsh's first term as leader would prove to be tumultuous as multiple scandals confronted him and the party. The newly-elected Labor Government pursued Walsh over his mismanagement and interference with the Office of Living Victoria (OLV) during the four years that Walsh was Water Minister, following findings by the State Ombudsman released prior to the 2014 election that Walsh had repeatedly meddled with staffing decisions, operational management, overseen breaches of government procurement rules, and multiple undeclared conflicts of interest that saw several lucrative government contracts awarded to former National Party consultants and advisers without going to public tender. Abolishing the OLV was one of Premier Daniel Andrews' first actions upon taking office, followed by the appointment of former auditor-general Des Pearson to investigate the OLV. Pearson identified rampant management failures typified by a lack of measurable objectives, lack of proper records and due diligence or record-keeping, over 90% of funded projects failing to achieve completion by deadline, $3.6 million in taxpayer funds having gone missing, and the funding of a smartphone app which never materialised. Labor Water Minister Lisa Neville subsequently announced that she was seeking to recover a number of questionable grants made during Walsh's tenure as minister, including a $500,000 grant to colourful property spruiker Henry Kaye for the construction of an "architectural masterpiece" in Melbourne's western suburbs but never eventuated.

In stark contrast to the party's reputation for stability during his predecessor Peter Ryan's leadership of the party, under Walsh's leadership numerous party scandals hit the headlines. In August 2017, former Cabinet minister Russell Northe resigned his party membership, further diminishing the party's already shrunken ranks, upon revelations that Northe had incurred over $750,000 in debts to constituents, former staff members, businessmen and colleagues, including a $30,000 debt to Walsh, as a result of Northe's gambling addiction. Victoria Police were subsequently called to investigate irregularities in the party's bank accounts connected to the Northe saga. Tim McCurdy was forced to relinquish his shadow ministry in March 2018 after Victoria Police announced that they had charged McCurdy with ten counts of fraud. To make matters worse, the party was embroiled in further controversy when it emerged that Walsh had taken the unprecedented step of overturning the party's democratic pre-selection result for the Western Victoria Region, snubbing the pre-selection winner, party vice-president Andrew Black, in favour of Ararat Rural City councillor Jo Armstrong.

The 2018 election was a landslide victory for the Australian Labor Party under Daniel Andrews that saw the Nationals reduced to a meagre 7 seats, the worst election result in the party's history. The party was reduced to just 1 seat in the upper house after Luke O'Sullivan the Northern Victoria Region, whilst Peter Crisp lost Mildura to an independent and the party placed third and fourth place in place in its formerly safe seats of Shepparton and Morwell, respectively. The election result left the party with less than the 11 seats required to qualify for official party status and the accompanying parliamentary staff and allowances that go with it.

Walsh was re-elected unopposed as leader alongside Steph Ryan as deputy leader and pledged to work harder to represent regional Victoria. In response to an announcement that the Victorian Nationals intended to create a news website to 'fill the void' in regional media, which would rely on writers working without pay and content being filtered by Walsh, media industry experts condemned the proposal, stating that they wouldn't want the party-controlled website to be mis-labelled as "news" as it would be tainted by vested interests.

In February 2022, Walsh, along with Matthew Guy, David Davis, Gary Blackwood and Melina Bath, were fined $100 each for breaching face mask rules, after the Coalition MPs were photographed maskless while attending an event in Parliament House.

Political views

Abortion 
Walsh voted against the Abortion Law Reform Act 2008, expressing his belief that life began at conception and that abortion should not be viewed simply as a "medical procedure". However, Walsh supported the Public Health and Wellbeing (Amendment) (Safe Access Zones) Bill 2015, which criminalises prayer and protest within 150 metres of an abortion facility.

Conversion therapy 
In line with his Coalition colleagues, Walsh voted for the Change or Suppression (Conversion) Practices Prohibition Act 2021 but committed to implementing amendments if the Coalition were to win the next election to address concerns raised by certain medical and religious organisations. Soon after taking that position, Walsh condemned members of his own party who shared those concerns and who had proposed a motion at the Victorian Nationals' 2021 state conference condemning the conversion therapy laws, using the issue to attack incumbent party vice-president Lee Marchant's attempt to win re-election. As commentators noted, Walsh appeared to be hypocritically attacking his own members for expressing the same views he and the Coalition had expressed earlier that year. The party's state conference ultimately passed a motion calling for the legislation to be amended, but the media onslaught proved successful in blocking Marchant's re-election bid.

After Matthew Guy replaced Michael O'Brien as Liberal and Coalition leader on 7 September 2021, Shadow Equality Minister James Newbury unilaterally announced that the Coalition no longer intended to amend the conversion therapy legislation if it won the next election. This prompted a heated internal row in the Coalition partyroom, with leaked recordings revealing that Walsh had profanely stated "From a Nationals point of view, we will not be supporting James on this position and he can go and get f---ed, simple as that".

Euthanasia 
Walsh voted against the Voluntary Assisted Dying Bill 2017 and predicted that the legalisation of euthanasia would cause a relentless increase in suicides.

Religion 
Walsh identifies as Catholic and has previously expressed pride in the social services provided by Catholic and other faith-based organisations.

Royal family 
Walsh has spoken positively about the impact of royal visits to Victoria, especially in times of crisis, also praising Prince Philip for his affinity to Australia and stating that he hopes that Queen Elizabeth II continues to reign as Queen of Australia for a long time to come.

Defamation 
Walsh has been successfully sued twice for defamation in his ministerial career. The first case in 2012 saw MyEnvironment Inc. sue after Walsh accused the group of commencing court proceedings in bad faith, despite a judge previously finding that the group had acted in good faith and the public interest. In 2014, proceedings were commenced against Walsh by Environment East Gippsland. Walsh entered into a confidential settlement with the environmental group, the terms of which required him to post a public apology on his official website.

References

External links
 Official Website
 Parliamentary voting record of Peter Walsh at Victorian Parliament Tracker

1954 births
Living people
Members of the Victorian Legislative Assembly
National Party of Australia members of the Parliament of Victoria
Recipients of the Centenary Medal
21st-century Australian politicians
Victorian Ministers for Agriculture